Marcy Harriell is an American actress, singer and writer. She is best known for her appearances on Broadway, starring in the Tony Award winning musicals In the Heights and Rent, and as the host of the fashion series Re:Fashion on TN Marketing's Craftsy.

Career
After starring as Maria in the 1996 National tour of West Side Story, Harriell made her Broadway debut on April 4, 1997 (after only 4 days of rehearsal) as Mimi in the Pulitzer Prize winning musical, Rent, starring opposite Adam Pascal. She went on to star in the Broadway musical Lennon, featuring the music of former Beatle, John Lennon; written and directed by Don Scardino. On November 11, 2008, she joined the cast of the 2008 Tony Award winning musical In The Heights, starring as Vanessa, opposite Lin-Manuel Miranda.

On television, Harriell has been a Series Regular on NBC's Ed, HBO's Nurse Jackie and the CBS courtroom dramedy Queens Supreme. She has been a guest star on numerous television programs, including: NCIS, Law & Order, Elementary, Royal Pains, Beauty & the Beast, Gone and Search Party.

In 2006, Harriell auditioned for the Quentin Tarantino film Death Proof (part of the double feature Grindhouse). Mr. Tarantino was so intrigued by Harriell's "southern boy" characterization, that he rewrote the part specifically for her and renamed the character Marcy.

In December 2013, Lin-Manuel Miranda recruited Harriell to help him record demos of his songs for the Disney animated motion picture, Moana. Harriell's outtakes of the songs "More" and "More (Reprise)" were included on the soundtrack.

Harriell plays Molly's mother in the 2019 motion picture Men in Black: International.

In 2022, Harriell was tapped as star vocalist by Mark Morris in his latest evening-length piece "The Look of Love" based on the classic Burt Bacharach, Hal David, Dionne Warwick hit songs. Premiering on the east coast at John F. Kennedy Center for the Performing Arts, The Washington Post noted “Performed by luminous chanteuse Marcy Harriell … Harriell’s voice reaches theater-filling force … Harriell ranges masterfully from hushed intimacy to a desperate, raging plea, making you feel the destruction of a soul.”

Among her many singing engagements, Harriell is a regular with the tribute project Loser's Lounge, created by Joe McGinty. With The Losers, Harriell has performed at The Public Theater, City Winery, Lincoln Center and the Montclair Film Festival.

Harriell is well known in the online sewing community through her popular blog oonaballoona, where she showcases her fashion designs and handmade wardrobe. She is the host of Re:Fashion, a show about sewing and fashion on TN Marketing's Craftsy. She has been a featured writer for magazines threads and Mollie Makes. In 2018, she was a guest on the Canadian sewing podcast Love To Sew where she talked about developing her confidence as a sewist.

Personal life
Harriell has been married to actor/writer/entrepreneur Robert Harriell since 1995.

Stage performances
Sources: Playbill IBDB Broadway World

Television performances
Sources: TV Guide TV.com

Film performances
Sources: TV Guide

References

External links
 Marcy Harriell official website
 Marcy Harriell official blog
 
 

American musical theatre actresses
American television actresses
American film actresses
American television hosts
African-American women singer-songwriters
African-American actresses
Year of birth missing (living people)
Living people
American women non-fiction writers
American voice actresses
African-American non-fiction writers
African-American fashion designers
Place of birth missing (living people)
American fashion designers
21st-century American non-fiction writers
21st-century American women writers
American women television presenters
21st-century African-American women singers